Little Si (pronounced ) is a mountain in the US state of Washington, named after its taller neighbor, Mount Si. Little and Big Si were named after local homesteader Josiah "Uncle Si" Merritt.

Little Si is a distinct mountain peak from Mount Si, with a different trailhead and a valley that separates the two peaks. Little Si is also known for its rock climbing and bouldering.

References

External links
 
 

Mountains of King County, Washington
Mountains of Washington (state)